The following articles list figure skating records and statistics:

Achievements 
 Major achievements in figure skating by nation
 World Figure Skating Hall of Fame

First performed

Dances 
 Compulsory dances

Jumps 
 History of first jumps
 Quad (figure skating)

International competitions

Major

Other

Discontinued competitions

Scores 
 List of highest scores in figure skating
 List of highest historical scores in figure skating
 List of highest junior scores in figure skating
 List of highest historical junior scores in figure skating

Standings 
 ISU World Standings and Season's World Ranking
 List of highest ranked figure skaters by nation
 List of ISU World Standings and Season's World Ranking statistics

Notes

References

External links 
 International Skating Union